Lee Yong-Seung  (born 28 September 1984) is a South Korean footballer who plays as a forward for Busan TC.

External links 

1984 births
Living people
Association football forwards
South Korean footballers
Gyeongnam FC players
Korean Police FC (Semi-professional) players
Jeonnam Dragons players
K League 1 players
Korea National League players
Sportspeople from Gangwon Province, South Korea